The national symbols of Cyprus are official and unofficial flags, icons or cultural expressions that are emblematic, representative or otherwise characteristic of Cyprus and of its culture.

Symbol

References 

National symbols of Cyprus